Yes, Please! is the sixth studio album of the jazz group Fourplay which was released by Warner Bros. Records in 2000.

Track listing

Personnel 

Fourplay
 Bob James – pianos, keyboards
 Larry Carlton – guitars
 Nathan East – bass guitars, vocals (6, 7), backing vocals (10)
 Harvey Mason – drums

Additional Musicians
 Ken Freeman – synthesizer programming 
 Chanté Moore – vocals (6)
 Sherree – lead and backing vocals (10)

Production 
 Fourplay – producers (1-9, 11)
 Nathan East – producer (10)
 Marcel East – producer (10)
 Don Murray – engineer, mixing (1-9, 11)
 Moogie Canazio – mixing (10)
 Steve Mixdorf – mix assistant (10)
 Ken Freeman – additional engineer, ProTools engineer
 Staffan Karlsson – additional engineer, ProTools engineer
 Christian Robles – additional engineer
 Dave Fisher – assistant engineer
 Jimmy Hoyson – assistant engineer
 Charlie Paakkari – assistant engineer
 Patrick Q.K. – assistant engineer
 Dylan Vaughan – assistant engineer
 Harvey Mason, Jr. – ProTools engineer
 Bill Smith – ProTools engineer
 Robert Vosgien – mastering
 Josh Henson – guitar technician
 Artie Smith – drum technician
 Debra Johnson – production coordinator

References

Fourplay albums
2000 albums
Warner Records albums
Albums produced by Nathan East